The NZASM 14 Tonner 0-4-0T of 1889 was a South African steam locomotive from the pre-Union era in Transvaal.

In 1889, the Nederlandsche-Zuid-Afrikaansche Spoorweg-Maatschappij acquired its first locomotives for use on the new railway which was being constructed from Johannesburg to Boksburg. Since the railway classified its locomotives according to their weight, these well-and-side-tank locomotives were known as the 14 Tonners.

The Randtram line
The line, which was opened on 17 March 1890, became known as the Randtram line, even though it was a railway in every aspect and not dedicated to tram traffic. This was the first working railway in Transvaal.

The concession was extended the following year to continue the line eastwards to Springs, where coal was known to exist, and westwards via Roodepoort to Krugersdorp. The entire  line was opened to traffic on 10 February 1891.

Manufacturer

In 1889, five well-and-side-tank locomotives with a 0-4-0 wheel arrangement, the first locomotives of the NZASM, were obtained from the German engineering firm and locomotive builder Maschinen­fabrik Esslingen, owned by Emil Kessler. They were erected at Elandslaagte near Johannesburg, now the city of Germiston. The engines were numbered in the range from 1 to 5 and placed in service on the new railway to Boksburg.

Characteristics
Their cylinders were arranged outside the plate frames. The Murdoch's D slide valves, mounted above the cylinders, were arranged at an incline and were actuated by Allan straight link motion. In this type of valve gear, the valve rod and the expansion link are respectively connected to opposing arms on the reversing shaft, so that partial rotation of the shaft moves the link and the die block in opposite directions.

Apart from the side-tanks, the locomotive also had a well-tank between the frames under the boiler barrel. The dome was on the front section of the boiler and the regulator valve was arranged in the smokebox.

Service

NZASM
As the Randtram line was expanded to the west and east to become the Reef line between Roodepoort and Springs, the 14 Tonners remained in service on that line, even though their range of operation was somewhat limited by their small coal and water carrying capacities.

The first locomotive, no. 1 named Transvaal, entered service on 18 July 1889.

Imperial Military Railways
All railway operations in the two Boer Republics, the ZAR and the Orange Free State, were taken over by the Imperial Military Railways (IMR) during the Second Boer War. The IMR renumbering register made provision for all five 14 Tonners in the number range from 601 to 605, but it is not known whether all five were renumbered.

Central South African Railways

At the end of the war, when the IMR was transformed into the Central South African Railways (CSAR), either three or four of the 14 Tonners survived and were renumbered, either from CSAR numbers A to C or from A to D. The uncertainty arises from the fact that the renumbering register lists CSAR no. D as both NZASM 14 Tonner no. 5 and one of the NZASM 18 Tonner locomotives.

NZASM numbers 2, 3 and 5 were presumably allocated IMR numbers 602, 603 and 605 respectively, but apart from either IMR no. 602 or 603 which presumably became CSAR no. B, it is not known whether they were renumbered. All three of them were converted into stationary boilers at some stage. The gap in the CSAR renumbering (see the table) suggests that only one of NZASM numbers 2 and 3 survived into CSAR stock, presumably becoming CSAR no. B.

Preservation
Even though none of them were in service any longer when the South African Railways renumbering was carried out in 1912, the last of four of the 14 Tonners was only scrapped in 1916. NZASM no. 1, the engine Transvaal, was preserved and was declared a national monument by Government Notice no. 529 on 6 April 1936. It was plinthed on Pretoria station until the late 1960s, when it was moved to the new Johannesburg station. It is now exhibited in the Outeniqua Transport Museum in George, Western Cape.

Works numbers
The NZASM 14 Tonner works numbers, IMR and CSAR renumbering and their disposal are listed in the table.

Illustration

References

0790
B locomotives
0-4-0T locomotives
Esslingen locomotives
Cape gauge railway locomotives
Railway locomotives introduced in 1889
1889 in South Africa